Anthony Rock (born 29 September 1970) is a former Australian rules footballer who played for North Melbourne and Hawthorn in the VFL/AFL.

Junior career

Rock played his junior football at St Dominic's Junior FC—a club that later folded due to lack of parent volunteers, leaving him without a club at age 13.

He moved to the Hadfield Football Club, and it was this club from which he was recruited by North Melbourne.

AFL career
He made his debut in the league during the 1988 season with North Melbourne. He stayed with the club a further 3 years after playing in their 1996 centenary premiership, moving to Hawthorn until his retirement in 2001. His final game was with VFL affiliate Box Hill Hawks, securing another flag in the club's first premiership.

Coaching career

From 2002 to 2004, Rock was the head coach and development manager of the North Ballarat Rebels in the TAC Cup. During this period, Rock guided many young players into AFL careers. Among those drafted under his tutelage were Jed Adcock, Clinton Young, Troy Chaplin, Shaun Grigg, Liam Picken, Matt Rosa, Michael Jamieson and Brad Sewell.

From 2005 to 2008, Rock was the Midfield Coach at Melbourne, St. Kilda, and then back to North Melbourne after departing the AFL system.

During this period (2011–2015), it was announced that Rock would become the new senior Coach at Greenvale in the Essendon District Football League. Here, he led the club to back-to-back Premierships (2012/13) before heading to St Bernards Old Collegians in the Victorian Amateur Football Association, where he coached them to a flag in the 2015 Premier Division. His time at St. Bernard's saw a further two of his players drafted in Mitch Hannan (Melbourne) and Ben Ronke (Sydney).

He then joined Fremantle as a development coach for the 2016 season and was then promoted to their Midfield Coach from 2017 to 2019.

Accelerate program 
In 2010, the AFLPA supported Anthony Rock with his Accelerate program which provided a unique opportunity for 20 young men rejected by the AFL draft the first time around by putting together an infrastructure of expertise in a bid to keep the game's most talented second-tier players from 18 to 23 in the correct physical and emotional state to win a second chance. In partnership with sports consulting group Infront, three major sponsors, and the AFLPA's support, Rock was able to set up partnerships with seven VFL clubs and worked with 20 footballers hoping to be drafted.

Statistics

|-
|- style="background-color: #EAEAEA"
! scope="row" style="text-align:center" | 1988
|style="text-align:center;"|
| 52 || 4 || 2 || 0 || 21 || 8 || 29 || 2 || 3 || 0.5 || 0.0 || 5.3 || 2.0 || 7.3 || 0.5 || 0.8 || 0
|-
! scope="row" style="text-align:center" | 1989
|style="text-align:center;"|
| 44 || 1 || 0 || 1 || 14 || 13 || 27 || 4 || 2 || 0.0 || 1.0 || 14.0 || 13.0 || 27.0 || 4.0 || 2.0 || 0
|- style="background-color: #EAEAEA"
! scope="row" style="text-align:center" | 1990
|style="text-align:center;"|
| 3 || 14 || 13 || 14 || 212 || 63 || 275 || 39 || 24 || 0.9 || 1.0 || 15.1 || 4.5 || 19.6 || 2.8 || 1.7 || 7
|-
! scope="row" style="text-align:center" | 1991
|style="text-align:center;"|
| 3 || 20 || 25 || 14 || 301 || 144 || 445 || 62 || 24 || 1.3 || 0.7 || 15.1 || 7.2 || 22.3 || 3.1 || 1.2 || 1
|- style="background-color: #EAEAEA"
! scope="row" style="text-align:center" | 1992
|style="text-align:center;"|
| 3 || 9 || 9 || 6 || 140 || 58 || 198 || 25 || 11 || 1.0 || 0.7 || 15.6 || 6.4 || 22.0 || 2.8 || 1.2 || 0
|-
! scope="row" style="text-align:center" | 1993
|style="text-align:center;"|
| 3 || 17 || 14 || 9 || 249 || 73 || 322 || 34 || 19 || 0.8 || 0.5 || 14.6 || 4.3 || 18.9 || 2.0 || 1.1 || 2
|- style="background-color: #EAEAEA"
! scope="row" style="text-align:center" | 1994
|style="text-align:center;"|
| 3 || 23 || 11 || 16 || 243 || 114 || 357 || 39 || 33 || 0.5 || 0.7 || 10.6 || 5.0 || 15.5 || 1.7 || 1.4 || 1
|-
! scope="row" style="text-align:center" | 1995
|style="text-align:center;"|
| 3 || 24 || 19 || 13 || 273 || 114 || 387 || 59 || 38 || 0.8 || 0.5 || 11.4 || 4.8 || 16.1 || 2.5 || 1.6 || 0
|- style="background-color: #EAEAEA"
|style="text-align:center;background:#afe6ba;"|1996†
|style="text-align:center;"|
| 3 || 25 || 23 || 24 || 368 || 159 || 527 || 95 || 43 || 0.9 || 1.0 || 14.7 || 6.4 || 21.1 || 3.8 || 1.7 || 3
|-
! scope="row" style="text-align:center" | 1997
|style="text-align:center;"|
| 3 || 22 || 14 || 9 || 297 || 115 || 412 || 69 || 40 || 0.6 || 0.4 || 13.5 || 5.2 || 18.7 || 3.1 || 1.8 || 0
|- style="background-color: #EAEAEA"
! scope="row" style="text-align:center" | 1998
|style="text-align:center;"|
| 3 || 19 || 8 || 8 || 157 || 81 || 238 || 44 || 17 || 0.4 || 0.4 || 8.3 || 4.3 || 12.5 || 2.3 || 0.9 || 5
|-
! scope="row" style="text-align:center" | 1999
|style="text-align:center;"|
| 32 || 15 || 7 || 6 || 129 || 85 || 214 || 40 || 23 || 0.5 || 0.4 || 8.6 || 5.7 || 14.3 || 2.7 || 1.5 || 0
|- style="background-color: #EAEAEA"
! scope="row" style="text-align:center" | 2000
|style="text-align:center;"|
| 32 || 24 || 10 || 4 || 235 || 129 || 364 || 91 || 32 || 0.4 || 0.2 || 9.8 || 5.4 || 15.2 || 3.8 || 1.3 || 0
|-
! scope="row" style="text-align:center" | 2001
|style="text-align:center;"|
| 32 || 5 || 0 || 1 || 35 || 21 || 56 || 15 || 11 || 0.0 || 0.2 || 7.0 || 4.2 || 11.2 || 3.0 || 2.2 || 0
|- class="sortbottom"
! colspan=3| Career
! 222
! 155
! 125
! 2674
! 1177
! 3851
! 618
! 320
! 0.7
! 0.6
! 12.0
! 5.3
! 17.3
! 2.8
! 1.4
! 19
|}

References

External links

1970 births
Living people
Australian rules footballers from Victoria (Australia)
North Melbourne Football Club players
North Melbourne Football Club Premiership players
Hawthorn Football Club players
Victorian State of Origin players
Box Hill Football Club players
One-time VFL/AFL Premiership players